An Inconvenient Sequel: Truth to Power: Your Action Handbook to Learn the Science, Find Your Voice, and Help Solve the Climate Crisis is a book by former Vice President and environmental activist Al Gore. It was written in conjunction with his 2017 documentary film, An Inconvenient Sequel: Truth to Power, and is a sequel to his 2006 book An Inconvenient Truth, published concurrently with his documentary of the same name. It was published on July 25, 2017 by Rodale, Inc. in Emmaus, Pennsylvania.

Synopsis
The book is intended to encourage and inform readers on how they can help fight anthropogenic global warming and climate change, and is a more in-depth analysis than the film. The book describes how humans have further damaged the environment since the release of An Inconvenient Truth, and makes more predictions about what will happen in the near future if humans fail to act. The book also describes advancements that have been made so far in the effort against global warming, such as developments in alternative energy sources. The book explores other aspects of the climate crisis, such as climate change denial and the corporate influence of money in politics, and ends by reasoning that it is not too late to solve the crisis.

References

Books by Al Gore
2017 non-fiction books
2017 in the environment
Climate change books
Rodale, Inc. books
Books about politics of the United States
American non-fiction books